The Applied Mathematics Panel (AMP) was created at the end of 1942 as a division of the National Defense Research Committee (NDRC) within the Office of Scientific Research and Development (OSRD) in order to solve mathematical problems related to the military effort in World War II, particularly those of the other NDRC divisions.

The panel's headquarters were in Manhattan, and it was directed by Warren Weaver, formerly of NDRC Division 7, Fire Control.  It contracted projects out to various research groups, notably at Princeton and Columbia Universities.

In addition to work immediately relevant to the war effort, mathematicians involved with the panel also pursued problems of interest to them without contracts from outside organizations.  Most notably, Abraham Wald developed the statistical technique of sequential analysis while working for AMP.

AMP was formally disbanded in 1946.

References
MacLane, Saunders.  "The Applied Mathematics Group at Columbia in World War II" in A Century of Mathematics in America, vol. 3 (ed. Peter Duren).  Providence: American Mathematical Society, 1989.
Owens, Larry.  "Mathematicians at War: Warren Weaver and the Applied Mathematics Panel, 1942–1945" in The History of Modern Mathematics, vol. 2 (eds. David E. Rowe and John McCleary).  Boston: Academic Press, 1989.
Rees, Mina.  "The Mathematical Sciences and World War II".  The American Mathematical Monthly (1980), 87, 607–621.
Wallis, W. Allen.  "The Statistical Research Group, 1942–1945".  Journal of the American Statistical Association (1980), 75, 320–330.

Agencies of the United States government during World War II
Mathematics organizations
Government agencies established in 1942
1942 establishments in the United States